Schmidt is a small lunar impact crater that is located near the southwest edge of Mare Tranquillitatis, to the southwest of the Ritter–Sabine crater pair. It was named after German astronomer Johann Friedrich Julius Schmidt, German optician Bernhard Schmidt and Soviet astronomer Otto Schmidt. This formation is circular and bowl-shaped, with little appearance of wear due to subsequent impacts. The interior has a higher albedo than the surrounding terrain, giving it a light appearance. The exterior consists of hummocky terrain with many boulders, ranging up to 100 m or more in diameter.

References

External links

 
 
 
 

Impact craters on the Moon